The episodes for the anime series GetBackers were produced by Studio Deen and based on the manga series of the same name written by Yuya Aoki and illustrated by Rando Ayamine. The series premiered on Tokyo Broadcasting System in Japan on October 5, 2002 and ran for forty-nine episodes until September 20, 2003 under direction of Kazuhiro Furuhashi and Keitaro Motonaga. The plot follows the "GetBackers", a group that retrieves anything that was lost. The team is primary composed by Ban Mido, a man born with the illusionary technique "Evil Eye", and Ginji Amano the former leader of a gang called "The VOLTS", a powerful group in the dangerous territory called the Limitless Fortress in Shinjuku.

The series was released to Region 2 DVD in Japan by TBS in seventeen individual volumes with three episodes per disc. The anime was first licensed in English by ADV Films. ADV released the English dubbed series in a total of ten Region 1 DVD volumes from August 24, 2004 to November 1, 2005. Compilations volumes from the seasons 1 and 2 were also released on October 10, 2006 and January 2, 2007, while a full compilation of the series was published on January 15, 2008. In April 2009, A.D. Vision started streaming the series online in their The Anime Network website. The series has been relicensed by Sentai Filmworks and re-released the series on May 8, 2012.

The anime's music was composed by Taku Iwasaki, and two original soundtracks were released by Pioneer Corporation in Japan on January 24, 2003 and July 25, 2003. Six pieces of theme music are used for the episodes; two opening themes and five ending themes, while one opening theme was also used as an ending theme. "Yuragu Koto Nai Ai" Tamura, which is the first opening of the anime, is also used as the ending of episode 49.

Episode listing

Season one

Season two

See also
 List of GetBackers characters

References
General
 
 

Specific

GetBackers
GetBackers